Francesca Pomeri (born 18 February 1993) is a water polo player from Italy. She was part of the Italian team at the 2016 Summer Olympics, where the team won the silver medal.

See also
 List of Olympic medalists in water polo (women)
 List of World Aquatics Championships medalists in water polo

References

External links
 

1993 births
Living people
Italian female water polo players
Water polo drivers
Water polo players at the 2016 Summer Olympics
Medalists at the 2016 Summer Olympics
Olympic silver medalists for Italy in water polo
World Aquatics Championships medalists in water polo
Sportspeople from the Province of Ancona
21st-century Italian women